The X class are a class of mainline diesel locomotives built by Clyde Engineering, Granville and Rosewater for the Victorian Railways between 1966 and 1976.

History

In preparation for the opening of the standard gauge line between Melbourne and Albury, the Victorian Railways had purchased a further eight S class locomotives, with the last of these entering service in 1961. But from that date traffic had increased, with a 20% increase in train miles being run by the end of the financial year by the middle of 1965, so the fleet was being stretched beyond reasonable capabilities.

Standard gauge trains at the time were typically rostered for a single S class locomotive, which could deliver approximately 1,800 hp. When one wasn't available, two T class locomotives (each delivering approximately 950 hp) could be and were used in lieu. This strategy could not, however, be a long-term solution as the T class had been designed for branch-line work and were restricted to 60 mph (96.6 km/h) rather than the 70 mph (112.6 km/h) top-speed of the S class, and the two T class units weighed roughly 24 tonnes (26.5 short tons) more than the single S unit - both major detriments to efficiency. On 23 July 1965, the Chief Mechanical Engineer, Mr Galletly, wrote that there was a need for an additional six 1,800 hp engines, which would allow the T class to be shifted back to their originally-intended duties. The plan at the time was to allocate two of the new engines to Standard Gauge operations, and the other four to Broad Gauge.

Tenders for contract 62902 were closed on 1 September 1965, with reviews completed nine days later. Three offers had been received; from English Electric, Goninan and Clyde Engineering. Clyde's proposal was viewed most favourably by the VR, as they offered the fastest delivery timeframe and a lower total cost of ownership by designing the new units to share many components not only with the S class but also (though to a lesser extent) the B class, both of which had also been designed and built by Clyde.

First Series - X31 to X36
Clyde's draft design was in general terms for an extended version of a fourth-order "low-nose" T class body (deliveries of which had commenced in early 1964), but based on the mechanical platform of the S class. After the tender had been won, three revisions were made (the major changes being the placement of the battery box) before the final design was approved as general arrangement drawing 2409983C.

As had been specified in the original tender documents, and despite external appearances, the driver's cabin was configured with a single set of controls positioned facing the long end of the hood (which was referred to as the Number 1 end). Driving with the Number 2 (short) end leading would technically be possible, though strongly discouraged as the driver would be sitting on the opposite side of the cabin to that expected by the positioning of trackside signals and signage while also having his back to the brake controls and speedometer.

The first batch of six were built in 1966 by Clyde at Granville in New South Wales with the model designation G16C and using GM EMD 16-567E engines, which would produce 1,810 hp for traction. The choice of the hood-style body made inspection and maintenance access to the engine and many of the other power-train components much easier compared to "streamline" units like the B and S classes, which could be inspected from within the body but required almost-complete disassembly to remove or exchange larger parts. After assembly and initial testing, each unit ran at least one trial trip on the Main North line to Broadmeadow, near Newcastle, before being marshalled into freight trains for delivery to and hand-over at Albury. All six units entered service by the end of 1966.

In keeping with the original plan, four of the six were to be converted to broad gauge operation on a rotating basis. Locomotive X31, however, was continually affected by a manufacturing issue with its pneumatically-operated Automatic Staff Exchanging equipment (which was of a new design) and so was excluded from the conversion rotation until the problem was finally resolved in the mid-1980s at Newport Workshops - though by this time the use of automatic-exchange equipment in Victoria was rapidly declining.

Otherwise, they hauled passenger and freight services throughout Victoria. On the broad gauge, they operated with the ten broad gauge S Class locomotives, with typical assignments being freight service to Adelaide, and associated passenger workings like The Overland and The Vinelander. However, it was rare for them to venture out to Gippsland until the late 1970s, and the Bendigo line was near-exclusively run with B class locomotives for sake of operational simplicity.

X33 was involved in a very serious head-on collision near Broadford loop only a few months after delivery, on 5 January 1967. It returned to Sydney for rebuilding by Clyde Engineering. However, X35 suffered much further when it fell off a bridge near Glenorchy in 1971, following a high-speed crash with a loaded gravel truck. The frame was permanently warped, making it "almost impossible" to properly align the engine and generator units. Not much later it was involved in a side-swipe that gouged a side of the body.

Second Series - X37 to X44
Only a few years after the delivery of X36, a further traffic increase meant additional engines were needed. Clyde Engineering was the only company to submit a tender for the contract (63420) by the closing date of 30 April 1969.

The tender was essentially for an upgraded version of the X Class, this time with at least 2,000 hp and, for the first time, crew comfort was taken into consideration with a maximum noise specification applied to the new design. The new engines were priced at a little under $300,000.

Shortly before the contract closed, two of the S class fleet were destroyed in the Violet Town rail accident. Victorian Railways spoke to Clyde about rebuilding those two engines from scratch, and the cost for rebuilding each would have been around $377,000 each - considerably more than the new order for X engines. So the contract for six additional engines was extended to eight instead. Paperwork shows X37 and X38 as rebuilds, but this was only for accounting purposes and no recycled components were included in those or other engines when first delivered.

The final production engine was fitted with the newly developed EMD 16-645E engine in place of the 16-567 (same shell but with larger pistons and other components), called the G26C design and rated at 2,200 hp. Externally the engines were similar to their predecessors but the larger engine spun at a higher rate (900 rpm versus the original 835 rpm), so larger radiator grilles were provided for heat dissipation. However, the radiator elements themselves were identical to the first order. The eight new engines were delivered across 1969–1970, and as before, the class was built in Clyde, tested around Sydney then delivered to Melbourne. On 14 August 2017 Seymour Railway Heritage Centre acquired class leader X31, link to article X37 for preservation purposes.

Third Series - X45 to X54
A third tender closed on 20 February 1974, for an additional eight or ten locomotives, this time rated for 2,200 hp. The specifications were similar to the as-delivered X37-X44, but with upgraded braking equipment. The reasoning for the order was that, as well as traffic increases (now up to 13.5 million train miles per year), the earlier diesel-electric locomotives were coming due for major overhauls, with no spare motive power to fill the gaps in the rosters (with all steam long-since gone).

Two offers were received for contract 64002 - one from Comeng, offering the standard ALCO locomotive constructed in with the engine block imported from the US, and Clyde Engineering offered more-or-less a repeat of the previous order for X locomotives, but this time constructed at the then-under-construction Rosewater, South Australia plant. The offers were designed for an order of either eight or ten locomotives.

Aside from the standard purchase order, the tendering companies were requested to offer alternative payment plans, including the rather novel option of leasing the locomotives for 25 years from the manufacturer, rather than outright purchase. This and other options ended up being more expensive than the traditional model (with payments during construction).

ALCO's offer totalled about $3.75 million against Clyde's $3.95 million, but this offer was rejected on grounds of much higher maintenance and running costs (based on NSW and SA experiences with ALCO engines), expecting between double and triple the cost per locomotive mile, as well as the need to purchase a separate set of spares for a new ALCO fleet at around $400,000.

The final agreement with Clyde was made out at a little under $4 million for ten locomotives, plus another $50,000 for spare parts.

During the contract negotiation stage, the VR was pushed by the AFULE to develop a new locomotive cab design intended only for single-end running; attempts to fit the previous X order with bidirectional running proved to be failures on account of driver discomfort. The new cab design allowed only for short-end-leading operation on the mainline, and to improve visibility the short-end nose was cut down to an angled profile similar to the last orders of the T class locomotive. Additionally, the engines were fitted with the upgraded AR10 alternator.

The ten new engines were delivered through 1975 on the broad gauge via the Main Western line. When the first, X45, arrived in Melbourne, it was named Edgar H Brownbill.

This series of engines were normally used on the interstate runs, where multiple engines were required so back-to-back formations overcame the single-end handicaps. In addition, about half the class spent extended periods on standard gauge, and they were the first Victorian Railways class of engine allowed to run in revenue service from Albury to Sydney from December 1982.

Modifications to the class
Following the 1969 Violet Town rail accident, the class were fitted with vigilance control systems. These engines could be identified by dimples on the cab roof. Around the same time the engine exhaust arrangement was modified. In the early 1980s they began working interstate to Adelaide and Sydney. Engines involved with interstate traffic were fitted with radios, and these engines had their builders plates removed and the cabside space utilised for "radio equipped" stickers.

By 20 July 1988, engines 33, 36-37, 39, 44, 46, 48-49 and 51-54 had all been fitted with cab air conditioning.

V/Line era
The class was gradually repainted from 1983 as the V/Line logo and colour scheme was introduced. During the following decade, air-conditioning units for the driver cabins were added to some engines, above the long-end nose and next to the cab end.

In August 1994 X35 was withdrawn following a major engine failure, and stored at South Dynon Locomotive Depot. In 1995 V/Line was split into two entities, V/Line Passenger and V/line Freight, with the freight side of the business taking the entire X fleet.

V/Line Freight, Freight Victoria, Freight Australia
V/Line Freight operated rather smoothly from 1995 to May 1999 when the entire business was sold off to a private entity, Freight Victoria. By this stage, only engines 33, 34, 36, 38, 43, 45 and 49 had been repainted in the V/Line Freight colour scheme (a slight modification on the previous V/line design), so X47 became the first to wear the green and yellow Freight Victoria colours in that month. Within a year, the business had been renamed Freight Australia, and the logos on engines were modified to reflect this.

X35 was purchased by the Seymour Railway Heritage Centre in 1998 for preservation, but transferred back to Freight Australia a few years later, for rebuilding as XR551. The condition of the transfer was that when X31 was to be retired, it would pass to Seymour for preservation.

Between 1997 and 1999, engines X47 and X49 had their short-end hoods rebuilt to allow for driver-only operation. The most noticeable difference is the wider windscreen windows.

Between 2001 and 2005, Freight Australia rebuilt six locomotives, fitting them with refurbished engines from G class locomotives, enlarged radiators, and modified cabs. These locomotives have subsequently been renumbered as the XR class.

Pacific National era
In 2004, Freight Australia was sold to Pacific National. All but two of the X fleet passed to Pacific National with the business in August 2004, these going to CRT Group and in June 2005 to QR National.

X36 had been planned for conversion to XR556, but this was cancelled when it was realised that the XR program wasn't much cheaper than simply buying new engines (the same as the B-to-A program in the mid-1980s). As a result, this and the remaining 1st- and 2nd-series X fleet saw reduced use and many class members were stored at Dynon.

Mid-2008 saw a number of 3rd-series engines transferred to New South Wales for grain traffic. X36 went along as well, and was normally based at Parkes and used as a trailing unit on the Manildra Group grain shuttle trains serving Manildra Mill (often between two 48 Class). It was scrapped in May 2015.

X31 was finally withdrawn from revenue services in 2009, and per the agreement laid out earlier, in January 2010, X31 was transferred to the Seymour Railway Heritage Centre. It has been returned to service and been hired to El Zorro and subsequently Qube. The class are now employed hauling freight services in New South Wales and Victoria.

In 2015, X45, X46 and X52 were sold to Ettamogah Rail Hub and X47 and X51 to SCT Logistics.

Status table

First Order

Second Order

Third Order

Model Railways

HO scale

1st series
In 2014, Trainbuilder released the first ready-to-run 1st-series X Class locomotive models on the market, as brass engines. At the end of 2015 Auscision released plastic 1st-series engines.

2nd & 3rd series
In the 1980s, Samhongsa/PSM released unnumbered but otherwise fully painted VR Blue/Gold, and V/line orange and grey brass models of the 2nd and 3rd series X locomotives.

In more recent times, Austrains released the first ready-to-run plastic model of the X Class diesel locomotive in 2004, with ten models of the second and third-series locomotives across three liveries. 2005 saw an unannounced expansion of the range at the Box Hill model railway exhibition in March, with four Freight Australia locomotives released. In 2007 the design was reworked to give smaller pilot holes for the coupler pockets, metal handrails and other details in better quality, with later releases in 2009 and 2010. 2014 saw the release of Trainbuilder's brass locomotives.

Years provided below are approximate.

Digital Models

Trainz Simulator 
Originally made for Trainz Simulator 2009, models representing each series were produced by user 'AD602000' and were downloadable via the Trainz Download Station

Models representing all series, modifications, and liveries were reproduced by an Australian Trainz 3rd party content developer group called Australian Trainz Division, made for a standard of Trainz: A New Era Service Pack 2 and above, these models are of significant higher quality than the previous models that were made for TS09. These models include custom interiors, opening doors, animated wipers, environment and specular texture maps and other highly detailed scripted effects. These were upgraded twice since then. One made when Austrainz formed and again to bring the locomotive up to TRS19 standards. This version included PBR texturing, more liveries and modifications that Pacific National made.

See also
Victorian XR class (diesel)
Victorian XRB class (diesel)

References

External links
 Railpage - X37 transferred to Seymour Railway Heritage Centre for Preservation

Clyde Engineering locomotives
Co-Co locomotives
Pacific National diesel locomotives
Railway locomotives introduced in 1966
X class
Standard gauge locomotives of Australia
Broad gauge locomotives in Australia
Diesel-electric locomotives of Australia